Ven mi corazón te llama is a 1942 Argentine film directed by Manuel Romero.

External links
 

1942 films
1940s Spanish-language films
Argentine black-and-white films
Films directed by Manuel Romero
Argentine musical films
1942 musical films
1940s Argentine films